Events from the year 1758 in art.

Events
 Charles Theodore, Elector of Bavaria, establishes a Kupferstich- und Zeichnungskabinett in the Mannheim Palace, predecessor of the Staatliche Graphische Sammlung München.

Works

 Pompeo Batoni
 Portrait of Pope Clement
 Portrait of Sir Wyndham Knatchbull-Wyndham
 Joshua Reynolds – Charles Lennox, 3rd Duke of Richmond
 Louis-François Roubiliac – Statue of Shakespeare
 John Shackleton – George II

Births
 March 14 – Franz Bauer, Austrian microscopist and botanical artist (died 1840)
 April 4
 John Hoppner, English portrait painter (died 1810)
 Pierre-Paul Prud'hon, French painter (died 1823)
 June 18 – Robert Bowyer, English miniature painter and publisher (died 1834)
 June 19 – Raffaello Sanzio Morghen, Italian engraver (died 1833)
 August 14 – Carle Vernet, French painter (died 1835)
 September 9 – Alexander Nasmyth, Scottish painter (died 1840)
 October 22 - Friedrich Rehberg, German portrait and historical painter (died 1835)
 December 31 – Johann Heinrich Bleuler, Swiss painter (died 1823)
 date unknown
 William Billingsley, English painter of porcelain (died 1828)
 James Fittler, English engraver (died 1835)
 Hyewon, Korean painter of the Joseon Dynasty (died unknown)
 Moritz Kellerhoven, Austrian painter (died 1830)
 Ryōkan, Japanese Sōtō Zen Buddhist monk poet and calligrapher (died 1831)
 (b. 1756/1758) – Francesco Piranesi, Italian engraver and architect (died 1810)

Deaths
 February 28 – Francesco Maria Raineri, Italian sculptor of battle scenes, landscapes, and vedute with historical or mythologic figures (born 1676)
 March 2 – Johann Baptist Zimmermann, German painter and a prime stucco plasterer during the Baroque (born 1680)
 June 27 – Michelangelo Unterberger, Austrian painter of religious themes (born 1695)
 August - François Hutin, French painter, sculptor and engraver (born 1686)
 August 24 – Bartolomeo Nazari, Italian portraitist of the late-Baroque (born 1693)
 September 9 – Isak Wacklin, Finnish painter (born 1720)
 October – Michael Ford, Irish mezzotint engraver (born unknown)
 October 19 – Agostino Masucci, Italian painter of the late-Baroque or Rococo period (born 1691)
 date unknown
 Ciro Adolfi, Italian painter of the Baroque period (born 1683)
 George Bickham the Elder, English writing master and engraver (born 1684)
 Elizabeth Blackwell, Scottish botanical illustrator and author (born 1700)
 Giuseppe Dallamano, Italian painter of quadratura in Turin (born 1679)
 Alonso Miguel de Tovar, Spanish painter of the late-Baroque or Rococo period (born 1678)

References

 
Years of the 18th century in art
1750s in art